Pop Said... is the debut album by the Welsh band the Darling Buds, released in 1989 via Epic Records. The album charted at number 23 on the UK Albums Chart.

The album was re-released by Cherry Red Records in 2006 in an expanded 21-track edition, including B-sides and rarities from the era.

Production
The songs were written by Harley Farr and Andrea Lewis. Pop Said... was produced by Pat Collier.

Critical reception
Trouser Press called the album "a dozen upbeat songs about love (of the puppy, crummy and lost varieties), all well sung and solidly played," writing that "repeated listenings may cause a sugar rush." The Boston Globe wrote that "each of the dozen tunes here is crafted like a classic pop single: killer hooks, race-and-roar guitar lines, telling catchphrases, girl-boy conflicts and emotional kicks." The Jerusalem Post deemed the album "replete with consummate pop songs." The New York Times wrote that "as the guitars surge and the catchy choruses pile up, the Darling Buds supply unrepentant pop pleasure."

Track listing

Original
All songs written by Harley Farr and Andrea Lewis
 "Hit the Ground" (2:19)
 "Burst" (2:51)
 "Uptight" (2:48)
 "The Other Night" (2:22)
 "Big Head" (2:24)
 "Let's Go Round There" (3:26)
 "She's Not Crying" (2:07)
 "Shame on You" (2:01)
 "You've Got to Choose" (2:17)
 "Spin" (2:41)
 "When It Feels Good" (3:44)
 "Things We Do for Love" (3:18)

2006 re-release bonus tracks
 "Just Say So" (3:11)
 "Pretty Girl" (2:43)
 "If I Said" (3:19)
 "Turn You On" (2:55)
 "Different Daze" (4:01)
 "Mary's Got to Go" (2:02)
 "I'll Never Stop" (3:25)
 "Shame on You – Slightlydelic Version" (4:35)
 "It's All Up to You – Flip Flop Version" (2:21)

Credits
Andrea Lewis – vocals
Geriant "Harley" Farr – guitar
Chris McDonogh – bass
Richard Gray "Bloss"- drums

References

1989 debut albums
The Darling Buds albums
Epic Records albums
One Little Independent Records albums